Fairhaven School may refer to:
 Fairhaven School (Upper Marlboro, Maryland)
 Fairhaven School Public Elementary School in Fairhaven, Saskatoon, Canada
 Fairhaven High School
 Fairhaven School, in Diamond Lake School District 76, Mundelein, Illinois
 Rumson-Fair Haven Regional High School
 Fairhaven School in the western Bay of Plenty Region, New Zealand